Live report is an alternative name for a live broadcast.

Live Report may refer to:
Live Report, a British band who came second in the 1989 Eurovision Song Contest
Live Reports, a record label for a Zavoloka & Kotra release
5 Live Report, a BBC radio programme
"Live Report", a track by Toby Fox from the soundtrack of the 2015 video game Undertale